Zomer is a Dutch surname meaning "summer". Some families have been traced back to a farm or other address with the name "summer house" or such, but others may have a personal descriptive origin. Vairiant forms are Somer and Zomers.  People with the name include:

Davide Zomer (born 1977), Italian football goalkeeper
Hanna Zomer (1925–2003), Czechoslovakia-born Israeli journalist
Hans Zomer (born 1968), Dutch humanitarian in Ireland
Herman Zomers (fl. 1938), Dutch East Indies football forward
Jan Pietersz Zomer (1641–1724), Dutch engraver and art collector
Johannette Zomer (born 1972), Dutch classical concert and opera soprano
Ramon Zomer (born 1983), Dutch football defender

See also
Sommers (surname)
Somers (surname)
Sommer

References

Dutch-language surnames